Much Too Shy is a 1942 British comedy film directed by Marcel Varnel and starring George Formby, Kathleen Harrison, Hilda Bayley and Eileen Bennett. The cast includes radio star Jimmy Clitheroe (as George's brother), later "Carry On'" star Charles Hawtrey, Peter Gawthorne and Joss Ambler.

Formby's featured songs are They Laughed When I Started to Play (Formby/Cliffe), Talking to the Moon About You (Day), Delivering the Morning Milk (Formby/Gifford/Cliffe) and Andy the Handy Man, written by Eddie Latta.

Plot summary
A simple handyman, who also is an amateur artist, gets into trouble when the head and shoulders portraits of some prominent local females are sold without his knowledge to an advertising agency and are published with nude bodies added to them.

Cast
 George Formby – George Andy
 Kathleen Harrison – Amelia Peabody
 Hilda Bayley – Lady Driscoll
 Eileen Bennett – Jackie Somers
 Joss Ambler – Sir George Driscoll
 Jimmy Clitheroe – Jimmy
 Frederick Burtwell – Harefield
 Brefni O'Rorke – Somers
 Eric Clavering – Robert Latimer
 Gibb McLaughlin – Reverend Sheepshanks
 Peter Gawthorne – Counsel
 Valentine Dyall - Defendant's Counsel	
 Gus McNaughton - Manager of Commercial Art School
 Wally Patch - Police Man	
 Charles Hawtrey - Osbert, the Art Student

Critical reception
Halliwell's Film Guide called the film "a slightly vulgar and talkative farce which restricts the star". A Radio Times reviewer commented, "although he was still Britain's biggest box office attraction, George Formby was already showing signs of the novelty fatigue that would result in the collapse of his screen career four years later...The cheeky wit that informed so many of Formby's songs is to the fore in this contrived comedy, but the storyline about the handyman with aspirations to become an artist simply isn't strong enough to sustain so much smutty innuendo".

References

External links

1942 films
1942 comedy films
British comedy films
1940s English-language films
Films directed by Marcel Varnel
British black-and-white films
Legal comedy films
Films set in London
Films shot at British National Studios
1940s British films